The 2001 season was the Washington Redskins' 70th in the National Football League, their 65th representing Washington, D.C. and the only season under head coach Marty Schottenheimer.
Despite an ugly start to the season at 0–5, the Redskins began a 5-game winning streak, and by week 14 were 6–6 and in the midst in the NFC playoff hunt. However, despite outplaying their next two opponents, the Redskins dropped two critical games to the Eagles and Bears, eliminating them from playoff contention, though they would finish the season on a high note at 8–8.

Offseason

NFL draft

Free agents

Personnel

Staff

Roster

Regular season

Schedule

Standings

References

Washington
Washington Redskins seasons
Red